George Berry may refer to:

Sportspeople
 George Berry (footballer) (born 1957), Welsh international football player
 Bill Berry (footballer, born 1904) (1904–1972), English footballer, known as George Berry when he played and coached in France
 George Berry (American football) (1900–1986), American football player

Others
 George Berry (Australian politician) (1913–1998), Australian politician
 George Berry (captain) (1706–1776), French and Indian War captain
 George J. Berry (born 1937), former Commissioner of Industry, Trade, and Tourism for the state of Georgia, 1983–1990
 George L. Berry (1882–1948), president of the International Pressmen and Assistants' Union of North America, 1907–1948
 George Ricker Berry (1865–1945), Semitic scholar and archaeologist
 George Berry (surgeon) (1853–1940), British eye surgeon and politician
 George Berry (born 1997), drummer and producer for Bears in Trees